Sardul Singh Kwatra was an Indian film director and music composer. He composed music for Hindi and Punjabi films.

Early life 
Kwatra was born in 1928 to a Sikh family in Lahore in British Punjab. He was very fond of music since his childhood. During his school days he got his initial training in classical music from Sardar Avtar Singh of Lahore. Later joined popular music director Hansraj Behl as an assistant.

Career 
After partition, Kwatra's family moved to Amritsar and then to Bombay. The first film of Kwatra Production was a Punjabi film, Posti (1950). The entire cast were refugees from Lahore. Kwatra picked Shyama for the female lead. The music of the film was a hit and critically acclaimed. Kwatra modified the folk tunes of Punjab and introduced Asha Bhosle and Jagjit Kaur, who was married to Mohammed Zahur Khayyam, as playback singers for Punjabi films, with Asha Bhosle making her debut. In 1953, another Kwatra Production, Kaude Shah with Shyama as heroine, became a success at the box office. Kwatra also composed the music of another Punjabi film Vanjara, in which Lata Mangeshkar sang majority of songs. He also introduced Shaminder as a playback singer. He later composed music for some Hindi films from which, Goonj and Mirza Sahiban 1953 are both successful.

In the mid 1970s Kwatra moved to Chandigarh and established the Chandigarh Film Institute in sector 5. His last assignment was a Punjabi film, Unkhilli Muttiar in 1983. He lived in Bombay from 1975 with his eldest son. He was great friends with actor Pradeep Kumar.

Kwatra left for U.S. where he died on 06.07.2005.

Personal life 
Kwatra was in love with a Muslim woman and composed some tunes celebrating her femininity and charm. He left Lahore in 1947 but his partner's appearance was constantly on his mind and once admitted that he "can't create good music without being in love."

Movies

Kwatra's song, "Tu Aaye Na Aaye” sang by Talat Mahmood, was used in the 1952 movie Bewafa 

 Ek Teri Nishani (1949)
 Jalte Deep (1950)
 Man ka Meet (1950)
 Shagan (1951) combine with Husnlal - Bhagatram 
 Posti (1951) Punjabi movie
 Goonj (1952) Home production movie banner under [ Kwatra Art Production's Ltd ]
 Mirza Sahiban (1953)
 Koday Shah (1953) Punjabi movie 
 Pilpili Saheb (1954) Home production movie banner under [ Kwatra Films ]
 Vanjara (1954) Punjabi movie
 Tees Maar Khan (1955)
 Son of Ali Baba (1955)
 Kala Chor (1956)
 Char Minar (1956)
 Adalat (1958 film)  Act only 
 Lady Robinhood (1959)
 Heer Sayal (1960) Punjabi Movie Directed by he's brother H.S Kwatra Home production movie banner under [Kwatra Pictures]
 Air Mail (1960)
 Dekha Jayega (1960)
 Gypsy Girl (1961)
 Khilari (1961)
 Billo (1961) Punjabi movie
 Deccan Queen (1962)
 Kala Chashma (1962) 
 Chandrashekhar Azad (1963)
 Satluj De Kande (1964) Punjabi movie 
 Accident (1965)
 Daku Mansingh (1971)
 Yamla Jatt (1977) Punjabi movie 
 Lambardarni (1980) Punjabi movie 
 Do Posti (1981) Punjabi movie
 Bagga Daku (1983) Punjabi Movie 
 Patwari (1983) Punjabi movie 
 Unkhilli Muttiar (1983) Punjabi movie

References 

Indian male composers
Indian Sikhs
People from Lahore
People from Chandigarh
Punjabi people
1928 births
2005 deaths
20th-century Indian composers
20th-century male musicians
Indian expatriates in the United States